Terri is an alternative spelling of Terry. It is a common feminine given name and is also a diminutive for Teresa.

Notable people with the name include: 
Terri Allard (born 1962), American country/folk singer/songwriter
Terri S. Armstrong, American scientist
Terri Attwood (born 1959), English professor
Terri Austin (born 1955), American educator and politician
Terri Bennett, Irish cricketer
Terri Bjerre (born 1966), American musician
Terri Blackstock (born 1957), American Christian fiction writer
Terri Bonoff, American politician
Terri Brisbin, American historical romance author
Terri Brosius, American musician and voice actor
Terri Brown, American athlete
Terri Bryant, American politician
Terri Butler, former Australian politician
Terri Lyne Carrington, jazz drummer, composer, and record producer
Terri Carver, American politician
Terri Cater, Australian former sprinter and middle-distance runner
Terri Clark, Canadian country music artist
Terri Collins, American politician
Terri Conley, American social psychologist
Terri Conn, American actress
Terri Crawford, Canadian musician
Terri Dendy, former American track and field athlete
Terri Dial (1949-2012), American banker
Terri Lynn Doss, American model and actress
Terri Doty, American voice actress, voice director, and ADR writer
Terri Dunning, former British swimmer
Terri Dwyer, English actress
Terri-Rae Elmer, radio news announcer
Terri Farley, American writer
Terri Fields, American book writer and teacher
Terri H. Finkel, American pediatric rheumatologist and immunologist
Terri Garber, American actress
Terri Gibbs, American country music artist
Terri Grodzicker, American molecular geneticist and virologist
Terri Hall (1953-2007), American erotic actress
Terri Hardin, Muppet puppeteer, actress and stand-up comedian
Terri Hanauer, Canadian-American actress
Terri Crawford Hansen, American journalist
Terri Harper, British professional boxer
Terri Hawkes, Canadian actress
Terri Hemmert, American radio personality and musicologist
Terri Hendrix, contemporary folk singer-songwriter from Texas
Terri L. Hill, American politician
Terri Hoffman (1938-2015), American writer
Terri Hogue, American hydrologist
Terri Hollowell, American singer
Terri Hoyos, American actress
Terri Irwin, Australian, American-born naturalist, author, and owner of Australia Zoo at Beerwah, Queensland, Australia
Terri Ivens, American actress
Terri Janke, Wuthathi/Meriam Indigenous lawyer
Terri Jentz, American writer
Terri Kimball, American model and Playmate of the Month
Terri Kwan, Taiwanese actress, model, singer and author
Texas Terri (formerly Terri Laird), punk rock singer and songwriter from Texas
Terri Lynn Land, Michigan Secretary of State
Terri Leigh, Canadian television anchor
Terri McCormick, Wisconsin State Representative
Terri Meyette, Yaqui poet
Terri Edda Miller, American screenwriter, producer, and director
Terri Minsky, American television writer and producer
Terri Mitchell, American women's basketball coach
Terri Moss, retired female boxer
Terri Nunn, American singer and actress
Terri O'Connell, former motorsports racing champion
Terri Paddock, American writer and arts journalist
Terri Poch, American bodybuilder and former professional wrestler
Terri Priest (1928-2014), American artist
Terri Proud, American politician
Terri Psiakis, Australian comedian and a presenter on radio and television
Terri Quaye, English musician
Terri Rachals, American nurse accused of murder
Terri Rogers (1937-1999), English ventriloquist and magician
Terri Roth, vice president of conservation and science at the Cincinnati Zoo and Botanical Garden
Terri Runnels, American former professional wrestling manager, television host and occasional wrestler
Terri Russell, former Australian cricket player
Terri Schiavo (1963-2005), diagnosed as being in a persistent vegetative state (PVS) for several years
Terri Schneider, American endurance athlete, motivational speaker, author, coach, and consultant
Terri Scott, education executive
Terri Sewell, American politician
Terri Seymour, British television presenter
Terri Sharp (1948-2015), American songwriter
Terri Stoneburner, American lawyer and judge
Terri Swearingen, American nurse
Terri Funk Sypolt, American politician
Terri Tatchell, Canadian screenwriter
Terri Te Tau, New Zealand contemporary artist and writer
Terri Willingham Thomas, American judge
Terri Thompson, American business journalist
Terri Treas, American actress, writer and director
Terri Utley, beauty queen and motivational speaker
Terri Vaughan, American insurance academic, regulator, and advisor
Terri J. Vaughn, American film and television actress
Terri Walker, English R&B and soul singer-songwriter
Terri Lynn Weaver, American politician
Terri Welles, American actress and adult model
Terri White, American actress and singer
Terri White (journalist), British journalist, editor and author
Terri L. White, mental health executive
Terri Williams-Flournoy, American women's basketball coach
Terri Windling, American editor, artist, essayist, and the author of books for both children and adults
Terri Witek, American poet
Terri Young, American pediatric ophthalmologist
Terri Zemaitis, retired American female volleyball player

Fictional characters
 Terri Alden, Three's Company
 Terri Johnstone, River City
 Terri McGreggor, Degrassi: The Next Generation
 Terri Schuester, Glee
 Terri Stivers, Homicide: Life on the Street
 Terri Webber, General Hospital
 Sherri and Terri, The Simpsons

People with the last name Terri
 Salli Terri, a singer, arranger, recording artist, and songwriter

Tropical cyclones
 Cyclone Terri (2001)

See also
 Teri (given name)
 Terry